Sparkle☆Train/Got To Leave (stylized as SPARKLE☆TRAIN/Got To Leave) is a single by female duo SOULHEAD from the album Naked. The main track, Sparkle☆Train, was an R&B/rap mix, while the b-side, Got To Leave, is smooth R&B. The single charted at #30 on Oricon Weekly, staying on the charts for eight weeks.

The music video for the title track was later put on the CD+DVD version of their Naked album.

Track listing
CD
SPARKLE☆TRAIN
Got To Leave
SPARKLE☆TRAIN (Instrumental)
Got To Leave (Instrumental)

References

2005 singles
2005 songs
Rhythm Zone singles